Kitikmeot, Unorganized is part of the Kitikmeot census division in Nunavut, Canada that covers the entire Kitikmeot Region outside the communities. There are no communities included in this area; it covers these traditional and outpost camps:
Fort Ross
Lupin
Perry Island
Read Island
Thom Bay

Demographics

References

Geography of Kitikmeot Region